George Washington Toland (February 8, 1796 – January 30, 1869) was an American politician from Pennsylvania who served as a Whig member of the U.S. House of Representatives for Pennsylvania's 2nd congressional district from 1837 to 1843 and as a Democratic member of the Pennsylvania Senate for the 1st district from 1833 to 1835.

Early life and education
Toland was born in Philadelphia, Pennsylvania to Henry Toland of Germantown.  He attended the common schools, and  graduated from Princeton College in 1816.  He studied law and was admitted to the bar in 1819.

Career
He held several local offices.  He was elected to the Pennsylvania House of Representatives in 1832 and 1844.  He was elected to the Pennsylvania State Senate for the 1st district and served from 1833 to 1855.

Toland was elected as a Whig to the Twenty-fifth, Twenty-sixth, and Twenty-seventh Congresses.

He died in Philadelphia in 1869 and is interred at Laurel Hill Cemetery.

Notes

Sources

The Political Graveyard

|-

1796 births
1869 deaths
19th-century American politicians
Burials at Laurel Hill Cemetery (Philadelphia)
Politicians from Philadelphia
Princeton University alumni
Whig Party members of the United States House of Representatives from Pennsylvania